La Marsa is a coastal town in far north eastern Tunisia near the capital Tunis. The population is estimated as 92,987, as of 2014. The old summer capital of pre-colonial Tunisia, it is today a popular vacation spot for many wealthy Tunisians. It is connected to Tunis by the TGM railway. Gammarth is adjacent to El Marsa further up the coast.

History
Ancient Carthage was a Semitic civilization centered on the Phoenician city-state of Carthage, located in North Africa on the Gulf of Tunis, outside what is now Tunis, Tunisia. It was founded in 814 BC. Originally a dependency of the Phoenician state of Tyre, Carthage gained independence around 650 BC and established a hegemony over other Phoenician settlements throughout the Mediterranean, North Africa and what is now Spain which lasted until the end of the 3rd century BC. At the height of the city's prominence, its political influence extended over most of the western Mediterranean and it was one of the major trade hubs.
For much of its history, Carthage was in a constant state of struggle with the Greeks on Sicily and the Roman Republic, which led to a series of armed conflicts known as the Sicilian Wars and Punic Wars. They also had conflicts  with the  Berbers, the indigenous inhabitants of the entire area where Carthage was built. In 146 BC, after the third and final Punic War, Carthage was destroyed and then occupied by Roman forces. Nearly all of the other Phoenician city-states and former Carthaginian dependencies fell into Roman hands from then on.

Attractions 
Abdalliya Palace is one of the most lavish creations Hafsid dynasty sultans. Built in the early sixteenth century by one of their last sovereign, Abu Abdallah Mohamed, this palace stands on the ancient port site of El Marsa. This place of remembrance and history is one of the few monuments Hafsid Tunisia. It is the oldest evidence of Muslim architecture Palatine remained in good state of conservation of the Maghreb.

Education 

La Marsa houses the following French international schools:
 Lycée Gustave Flaubert
 École Paul-Verlaine

They are a part of the Etablissement Régional De La Marsa (ELRM) which has 7 schools in Tunisia as members.

La Marsa also houses four primary schools:

 École primaire Habib Bourguiba
 École primaire Nahj el Ward
 École primaire El Tabbek
 École primaire El Riadh

La Marsa also houses 3 middle schools:

 Collège fadhel ben achour
 Collège tayeb mhiri
 Collège Rmila

Transport 

 Tunis-Goulette-Marsa (TGM) is a 19 km  light rail line linking the capital Tunis with El Marsa via La Goulette.
 The TGM was the first railway in Tunisia and inaugurated in 1872. Since 1905 it has been known as the TGM. It is part of the transportation system of the Tunis area, and together with the light rail of Tunis (Le métro léger de Tunis) managed by the Société des transports de Tunis (Transtu). Transtu was founded in 2003 by joining the Société du métro léger de Tunis (SMLT, founded 1981) and the Société nationale de transports (SNT, founded 1963).

Transports that passes through the N9 Highway:

The bus line N°20 from Tunis Passage to La Marsa El Riadh, managed by the Société des transports de Tunis (Transtu) 
The bus line TCV from Tunis Passage to La Marsa Sidi Abdelaziz managed by a private company (Transport En Commun De Voyageur)
The collective taxi (Taxi jama3i), it is the fastest way to go to La Marsa from Tunis

Sport 
AS Marsa
Avenir Sportif de El Marsa (Arabic: المستقبل الرياضي بالمرسى, often referred to as ASM) is a football club from El Marsa in Tunisia.  
Founded in 1939, the team plays in green and yellow colours. Their ground is Stade Abdelaziz Chtioui, which has a capacity of 6,000. When  
the club was founded its name was Club Musulman (Muslim Club).

Stade Abdelaziz Chtioui
Stade Abdelaziz Chtioui (Arabic: ملعب عبدالعزيز شتوي) is a football stadium in El Marsa, Tunisia. It is currently used by football team Avenir Sportif de El Marsa commonly called the AS Marsa. The stadium holds 6,000 people.

References

External links 
 View of El Marsa
 Lexicorient
 La Goulette - Carthage - El Marsa
 
 

Populated places in Tunis Governorate
Populated coastal places in Tunisia
Communes of Tunisia